The 1946 Glasgow Cathcart by-election was held on 12 February 1946.  The byelection was held due to the death  of the incumbent Conservative MP, Francis Beattie.  It was won by the Conservative candidate John Henderson.

References

Glasgow Cathcart by-election
Glasgow Cathcart by-election, 1946
Glasgow Cathcart by-election 
Cathcart, 1946
Cathcart by-election, 1946
Glasgow Cathcart by-election